General Smith may refer to:

Australia
Andrew Smith (brigadier), Australian Army brigadier general
Robert Smith (Australian Army officer) (1881–1928), Australian Army brigadier general
Steve Smith (general) (born 1959), Australian Army Reserve major general
Stuart Smith (general) (born 1963), Australian Army major general
Walter Edmond Smith (1895–1976), Australian Army brigadier general

United Kingdom
Sir Arthur Smith (British Army officer) (1890–1977), British Army lieutenant general
Clement Leslie Smith (1878–1927), British Army brigadier general
Edward Smith (British Army officer) (died 1808), British Army general
Francis Smith (British Army officer) (1723–1791), British Army major general
Sir Frederick Smith (British Army officer, born 1790) (1790–1874), British Army general
Greg Smith (British Army officer) (born 1956), British Army major general
Sir Harry Smith, 1st Baronet (1787–1860), British Army lieutenant general
James George Smith Neill (1810–1857), British Army brigadier general
James Webber Smith (1778–1853), British Army lieutenant general
Sir John Smith (British Army officer, born 1754) (1754–1837), British Army general
Joseph Smith (East India Company officer) (1732/3–1790), British East India Company general
Joshua Simmons Smith, British Army general
Sir Lionel Smith, 1st Baronet (1778–1842), British Army lieutenant general
Martin Smith (Royal Marines officer) (born 1962), Royal Marines major general
Michael William Smith, British Army general
Philip Smith (British Army officer) (–died 1894), British Army lieutenant general
Richard Smith (East India Company officer) (1734–1803), British East India Company brigadier general
Sir Rupert Smith (born 1943), British Army general
Wilfrid Smith (British Army officer) (1867–1942), British Army major general
Sir William Douglas Smith (1865–1939), British Army major general

United States
Albert C. Smith (general) (1894–1974), U.S. Army major general
Alfred T. Smith (1874–1939), U.S. Army brigadier general
Andrew Jackson Smith (1815–1897), Union Army major general
C. R. Smith (1899–1990), U.S. Air Force major general
Charles Bradford Smith (1916–2004), U.S. Army brigadier general
Charles Ferguson Smith (1807–1862), Union Army major general
David R. Smith (general) (1941–), U.S. Air Force major general
Dirk D. Smith (fl. 1980s–2010s)), U.S. Air Force major general
Donald B. Smith (born 1947), U.S. Army brigadier general
Edmund Kirby Smith (1824–1893), U.S. Army general
Edwin P. Smith (born 1945), U.S. Army lieutenant general
Eric Smith (general) (fl. 1980s–2020s), U.S. Army major general
Frederick Appleton Smith (1849–1922), U.S. Army brigadier general
Frederic H. Smith Jr. (1908–1980), U.S. Air Force general
Giles Alexander Smith (1829–1876), Union Army major general
George R. Smith (Paymaster-General) (1850–1928), U.S. Army Paymaster-General
George W. Smith (USMC) (1925–2014), U.S. Marine Corps major general
George W. Smith Jr. (1990s–2020s), U.S. Marine Corps lieutenant general
Green Clay Smith (1826–1895), Union Army brigadier general

Holland Smith (1882–1967), U.S. Marine Corps general
Homer D. Smith (1922–2011), U.S. Army major general
Isaac D. Smith (born 1932), U.S. Army major general
Jacob H. Smith (1840–1918), U.S. Army general
James Smith (Texas General) (1792–1855), Texas Revolutionary Army general
James Francis Smith (1859–1928), U.S. Army brigadier general
Jeffrey G. Smith (1921–2021), U.S. Army lieutenant general
John E. Smith (1816–1897), Union Army brigadier general
Joseph Smith (general) (1901–1993), U.S. Air Force lieutenant general
Julian C. Smith (1885–1975), U.S. Marine lieutenant general
Keith Smith (general) (1928–2012), U.S. Marine Corps lieutenant general
Lance L. Smith (born 1946), U.S. Air Force general
Leo W. Smith II (born 1936), U.S. Air Force lieutenant general
Leslie C. Smith (fl. 1980s–2020s), U.S. Army lieutenant general 
Morgan Lewis Smith (1822–1874), Union Army brigadier general
Norman H. Smith (born 1933), U.S. Marine Corps lieutenant general
Oliver P. Smith (1893–1977), U.S. Marine Corps general
Paul F. Smith (1915–2014), U.S. Army major general

Perry G. Smith Sr. (born 1949), Alabama National Guard major general
Perry M. Smith (born 1934), U.S. Air Force major general
Persifor Frazer Smith (1798–1858), U.S. Army brigadier general
Phillips Waller Smith (1906–1963), U.S. Air Force major general
Ralph C. Smith (1893–1998), U.S. Army major general
Ray L. Smith, U.S. Marine Corps major general
Stephen G. Smith (general) (fl. 1990s–2020s), U.S. Army major general
Tammy Smith (1963–), U.S. Army brigadier general
Thomas Adams Smith (1781–1844), U.S. Army brigadier general
Thomas C. H. Smith (1819–1897), Union Army brigadier general
Thomas Kilby Smith (1820–1887), Union Army brigadier general
Walter Smith (American football) (1875–1955), U.S. Army brigadier general
Walter Bedell Smith (1895–1961), U.S. Army general
Wayne C. Smith (1901–1964), U.S. Army major general
William Smith (Paymaster general) (1831–1912), U.S. Army brigadier general
William Farrar Smith (1824–1903), Union Army major general
William Ruthven Smith (1868–1941), U.S. Army major general
William Sooy Smith (1830–1916), Union Army major general
William Y. Smith (1925–2016), U.S. Air Force general

U.S. state militias
Daniel Smith (surveyor) (1748–1818), Tennessee Militia brigadier general
Francis Henney Smith (1812–1890), Virginia Militia major general
Heman R. Smith (1795–1861), Vermont Militia major general
Jesse C. Smith (1808–1888), New York Militia brigadier general
Joseph Smith (1805–1844), Illinois Militia lieutenant general
Samuel Smith (Maryland politician) (1752–1839), Maryland Militia major general

Confederate States Army
Gustavus Woodson Smith (1821–1896), Confederate States Army major general
James Argyle Smith (1831–1901), Confederate States Army brigadier general
Martin Luther Smith (1819–1866), Confederate States Army major general
Melancthon Smith (Confederate officer) (1829–1881), Mississippi Militia major general
Preston Smith (general) (1823–1863), Confederate States Army brigadier general
Thomas Benton Smith (1838–1923), Confederate States Army brigadier general
William Smith (Virginia governor) (1797–1887), Confederate States Army major general
William Duncan Smith (1825–1862), Confederate States Army brigadier general

Other countries
Brian L. Smith (born 1939), Canadian Air Force lieutenant general
Carlos Smith (Argentine officer) (1845-1913), Argentine Army general
Desmond Smith (Canadian Army officer) (1911–1991), Canadian Army general
Joseph Henry Smith (born 1945), Ghana Army lieutenant general
Lawrence Smith (South Africa), South African Army major general

See also
William Aird-Smith (1993–1942), British Army brigadier general
Edward Percival Allman-Smith (1886–1969), British Army brigadier general
Sir Horace Smith-Dorrien (1858–1930), British Army general
Merton Beckwith-Smith (1890–1942), British Army major general
Mark Carleton-Smith (born 1964), British Army general
Sir Anthony Denison-Smith (born 1942), British Army lieutenant general
Eric Dorman-Smith (1895–1969), Irish Republican Army Acting major general
Sir Edmund Hakewill-Smith (1896–1986), British Army major general
Len Roberts-Smith (born 1945), Australian Army Reserve major general
Artur Schmitt (1888–1972), German Army lieutenant general
Maurice Schmitt (born 1930), French Army general
Admiral Smith (disambiguation)
Attorney General Smith (disambiguation)
General Smyth (disambiguation)
Smith (surname), a family name (surname) originating in England